Trhová Kamenice is a market town in Chrudim District in the Pardubice Region of the Czech Republic. It has about 1,000 inhabitants.

Administrative parts
Villages and hamlets of Hluboká, Kameničky, Petrkov 3.díl, Polom, Rohozná and Zubří are administrative parts of Trhová Kamenice.

Geography

It lies in the Iron Mountains and in the eponymous protected landscape area.

Trhová Kamenice is situated on the Chrudimka River. The territory is rich in ponds. The largest pond in Trhová Kamenice and in the entire Iron Mountains is Rohozenský velký, which forms half of the  large Strádovka Nature Reserve.

History
The first written mention of this area is in a donation deed from 1242. A settlement was founded here probably by the monastery in Vilémov. At the end of the 14th century, the ironworks were founded and the production of charcoal started. In the 15th century, the economical development occurred and in 1499, Trhová Kamenice became a market town

On 8 May 1945, when Trhová Kamenice was under Nazi occupation, several Nazi troops were passing through the market town from Chrudim back to Nazi Germany and massacred 14 people while finding resistance partisans.

Notable people
František Šmahel (born 1934), historian

Twin towns – sister cities

Trhová Kamenice is twinned with:
 Oberembrach, Switzerland

References

External links

Market towns in the Czech Republic
Populated places in Chrudim District